Godmother is a 1999 Hindi biographical drama film directed by Vinay Shukla released in 1999, and ostensibly inspired by the life of Santokben Jadeja, who ran the Mafia operations at Porbandar, Gujarat, in the late 1980s and early 1990s and later turned politician.

Cast
 Shabana Azmi - Rambhi
 Milind Gunaji - Veeram
 Nirmal Pandey - Jakhra
 Govind Namdev- Kesubhai
 Vinit Kumar - Lakhubhai
 Loveleen Mishra - Ramde's wife
 Raima Sen - Sejal
 Sharman Joshi - Karsan

Music
Sanjeev Abhyankar (singing), Vishal Bhardwaj (music) and Javed Akhtar (lyrics) won the National Awards for this movie. The songs were:
 "Gunje Gagan Gunje Lalkaren Ham" (singer: Roop Kumar Rathod)
 "Matee Re Matee Re" (singer: Lata Mangeshkar)
 "Raja Kee Kahanee Puranee Ho Gayee" (singers: Usha Uthup, Rekha, Kavita Krishnamurthy )
 "Suno Re Suno Re Bhayila" (singer: Sanjeev Abhyankar )
 "Tum Agar Yeh Mujhse Puchho" (singer: Abhijeet )

Awards

National Film Awards – 1998
 National Film Award for Best Feature Film in Hindi
 National Film Award for Best Music Direction: Vishal Bhardwaj
 National Film Award for Best Editing: Renu Saluja
 National Film Award for Best Actress: Shabana Azmi
 National Film Award for Best Male Playback Singer: Sanjeev Abhyankar
 National Film Award for Best Lyrics: Javed Akhtar
 National Film Award for Best Costume Designer: Mandira Shukla (Nominated)

Filmfare Awards
 Filmfare Best Story Award: Vinay Shukla

IIFA Awards
 IIFA Best Background Score Award: Vishal Bhardwaj

References

External links

 Godmother at Yashraj Films

1999 films
1999 crime drama films
1990s Hindi-language films
Films featuring a Best Actress National Award-winning performance
Indian crime drama films
Indian biographical drama films
Films set in Gujarat
Films about women in India
Films scored by Vishal Bhardwaj
Films whose editor won the Best Film Editing National Award
Best Hindi Feature Film National Film Award winners
Films distributed by Yash Raj Films
1990s biographical drama films